The Brazilian Mathematical Society (SBM) is a professional association founded in 1969 at Instituto de Matemática Pura e Aplicada to promote mathematics education in Brazil.

Presidents 

1969–1971 Chaim Samuel Honig
1971–1973 Manfredo do Carmo
1973–1975 Elon Lages Lima
1975–1977 Maurício Peixoto
1977–1979 Djairo Guedes de Figueiredo
1979–1981 Jacob Palis
1981–1983 Imre Simon
1983–1985 Geraldo Severo de Souza Ávila
1985–1987 Aron Simis
1987–1989 César Camacho
1989–1991 Keti Tenenblat
1991–1993 César Camacho
1993–1995 Márcio Gomes Soares
1995–1997 Márcio Gomes Soares
1997–1999 Paulo Domingos Cordaro
1999–2001 Paulo Domingos Cordaro
2001–2003 Suely Druck
2003–2005 Suely Druck
2005–2007 João Lucas Marques Barbosa
2007–2009 João Lucas Marques Barbosa
2009–2011 Hilário Alencar
2011–2013 Hilário Alencar
2013–2015 Marcelo Viana
2015–2017 Hilário Alencar
2017– Paolo Piccione

Awards and prizes
The SBM distributes many prizes, including the Brazilian Mathematical Society Award and the Elon Lages Lima Award.

Publications 

Journals:
 Bulletin of the Brazilian Mathematical Society
 Eureka!
 Matemática Contemporânea
 Ensaios Matemáticos
 Matemática Universitária
 Professor de Matemática Online
 Revista do Professor de Matemática

See also 
Instituto Nacional de Matemática Pura e Aplicada
Brazilian Mathematics Olympiad of Public Schools

External links 
SBM  - Sociedade Brasileira de Matemática (Official website)

 
Organizations established in 1969
Mathematical societies
Scientific organisations based in Brazil